Bernadotte & Kylberg was founded in 2012 and has designed products for many brands. The Design Duo designs both industrial as graphic products with the user in focus. Their first joint project was the stylish series of bowls for the Gustavsbergs Porslinsfabrik, called “Svenska djur” (Swedish animals).  For the Swedish brand A-One, Bernadotte & Kylberg has designed many collections of thinner down jackets.

In a charity project for Childhood, Bernadotte & Kylberg designed the carpet “Middle of Nowhere” out of scrap silk parachutes for the brand Vandra Rugs. Out of that pattern, the idea of a collection with the department store chain Åhléns and Bernadotte & Kylberg was born. The collaboration consists of home textiles such as carpets, plaids, pillowcases, towels, bedspreads and bed sets.

In February 2014, the collaboration between the duo and the Danish design company Stelton was presented which is Bernadotte & Kylbergs first international assignment. The collection “Stockholm” consists of a series of bowls and vases, made out of aluminium and enamel with inspiration from the sea. The bowls and vases in the Stockholm Aquatic collection designed for Stelton, are presented with the award for “high quality design” by the Red Dot Award 2015.

Oscar Kylberg and Carl Philip Bernadotte have both studied graphic design at Forsbergs School. Carl Philip Bernadotte has studied design at Rhode Island School of Design in the USA where he also won a design competition – under a pseudonym. Oscar Kylberg has worked with design and brands in international and national contexts and as Creative Director.

References

Swedish graphic designers
Swedish industrial designers
2012 establishments in Sweden